The Durdzuks, also known as Dzurdzuks, was a medieval ethnonym used mainly in Georgian and Arabic sources in the 9th-18th centuries in reference to the Vainakh.

Ethnonym
The Durdzuks, Durdzuk is a medieval ethnonym used mainly in Georgian, Armenian and Arabic sources in the 8th-18th centuries. Most researchers identify the Durdzuks as the modern Ingush and Chechens. Some localize the Durdzuks in mountainous Ingushetia and identify them with the Ingush people others believe that in the period In the Middle Ages, the population of Chechnya was known to the South Caucasian peoples under the name "Durdzuks", or "Dzurdzuks"  and the population of Ingushetia under the names "Glighvi", "Ghilighvi".. In 1745, Georgian geographer Vakhushti of Kartli noted that the country "Durdzuketi consists of Kisti, Durdzuki and Gligvi", placing the first in the vicinity of the Darial Gorge and the latter the more east of the three, bordering Pankisi, Tusheti and Didoeti. The Georgian historian V.N. Gamrekeli claims that “Durdzuk” is definitely and, with all its references, uniformly localized, between Didoeti-Dagestan in the east and the gorge of the Terek River, in the west.

The Durdzuks are mentioned in the 7th-century work Geography of Armenia by Anania Shirakatsi as the Dourtsk.

History

According to the Georgian royal annals:

Durdzuk was mentioned by the Chronicles as "the most distinguished among the descendants of Kavkas", who led his people, the Durdzuks, into the mountains, where they would become the ancestors of today's Vainakh peoples. Before his death, Targamos [Togarmah] divided the country amongst his sons, with Kavkasos [Caucas], the eldest and most noble, receiving the Central Caucasus. Kavkasos engendered the Vainakh tribes, and his descendant, Durdzuk, who took residence in a mountainous region, later called "Dzurdzuketia" after him, established a strong state in the fourth and third centuries BC.

A. J. Saint-Martin French orientalist: “Dzurdzuk, the most famous of the sons of Kavkazos, retired to a valley in the mountains, which was named after him Dzurdzuketi (now Misjegi).”

In the Armenian adaptation of Georgian Chronicles, the Durdzuks defeated the Scythians and became a significant power in the area in the region in the first millennium BC.

A. Kurkiev associated the term «Dzurdzuki» or «Durzuki» with the term «dardza ​​k'ongash» («sons of the blizzard») in the Nart legends of the Ingush («Mother of the blizzard" and "Seven sons of the blizzard»).

According to Georgian Chronicles, the Durdzuks allied themselves with Georgia, and helped the first Georgian king Pharnavaz I of Iberia consolidate his reign against his unruly vassals. The alliance with Georgia was cemented when King Pharnavaz married a Durdzuk girl.

The Durdzuks are said to have raided Kakheti and Bazaleti during the reign of Mirian I, who invaded and ravaged the land of the Durdzuks in retaliation. Later on, the Durdzuks are mentioned fighting the Mongols alongside their Georgian allies as well as the Ossetians. Durdzuk soldiers are also mentioned fighting alongside Georgians against the troops of Jalal al-Din Mangburni. Queen Tamar of Georgia was highly esteemed, and the Durdzuks named daughters as well as bridges and other buildings after her.

The "Gate of Durdzuks" mentioned in Georgian sources is thought to have been in the Assa gorge of Ingushetia, which is a path connecting the North and South Caucasus regions.

See also
Dvals
Peoples of the Caucasus
Princedom of Simsim
Surakat
Khour II
Chechen-Kazikumukh war
Timurid invasions of Simsim
Mongol invasions of Durdzuketi

References

Further reading
Гамрекели В. Н., Двалы и Двалетия в I-XV вв. н. э., Тб., 1961
Шавхелишвили А. И., Из истории взаимоотношений между грузинским и чечено-ингушским народами (С древнейших времён до XV века), Грозный, 1963

History of the North Caucasus
Peoples of the Caucasus
Nakh peoples
Ethnonyms of the Ingush